The issuing of the current license plates of the DRC began in April 2009. The plates are based on the layout of the registration plates of the European Union, but are of a slightly different in size (480 × 112 mm) than the European standard size (520 × 110 mm). At the left side is the national flag of the DRC which is displayed with the letters "CGO" below. The serial combination consists of five numbers followed. In addition, located on the front windshield of the vehicle, a so-called third mark in the form of an 84 × 53 mm large sticker. It repeats the serial combination on the plate and it also includes the chassis number of the vehicle.

The DRC plates are produced by Utsch.  The plates have various security features to make counterfeiting difficult.  For example, the background of all letters has a hologram foil labeled authentic. Similar measures are also found in the plates produced by Utsch for the licenses of Egypt and Kyrgyzstan.

Special plates

 Plate diplomatic red on yellow, 3 digits corresponding to a country code, the CD symbol, 2 or 3 digits
 Plate consular corps: red on yellow, 3 digits corresponding to a country code, the CC logo, 2 or 3 digits
 Plate of the FARDC: white on black, FARDC followed by 7 digits
 Plaque from the United Nations, MONUC: black and white, the symbol A, 3 or 4 digits
 Plate EUSEC: yellow to dark blue, EUSEC abbreviation followed by 3 figures
 Plate EUPOL yellow to dark blue, EUPOL abbreviation followed by 3 figures
 Temporary registration plate: white on dark blue, 3 figures, the IT acronym, 3 figures
 Plate authorities:
Presidential **: black and white, the PR initials followed by 3 or 4 digits
 National Assembly: black and white, the AA acronym followed by 3 figures
 Senate: black and white, the symbol ASEN followed by 3 figures
 Justice: black and white, the ADJ abbreviation followed by 3 figures

Previous plates

Older style license plates have different letter and background colors depending upon the era when the plate was issued. Each plate carried the initials of the province where the car was registered, but sometimes the abbreviation of another province would be issued.

 Yellow numbers on Blue background (1958 - 1960), Belgian Congo
 Yellow numbers on Blue background (1960 - 1979), DRC/Zaire, but no change from Belgian Congo style
 Yellow numbers on Green background (1979 - 1997), Zaire
 Black numbers on yellow background (1997)
 Yellow numbers on blue background (1980 - 2009)

The style of the Belgian Congo plates, yellow numbers on a blue background, was continued by the DRC/Zaire until 1979. Plates started with a yellow star, followed by one or two letters with a maximum of four digits after the letter.

In 1979 the plate colors were changed to yellow numbers on a green background. At the beginning were now two provincial letters followed by four digits and a further letter.

In 1997 the plates were redesigned to show a two letter province code, followed by four numbers, and a two letter suffix. These plates had black numbers on a yellow background (430 × 105 mm).

With the change of the country's name back to the DRC in 1997, the license plates returned to the traditional colors of yellow numbers on a blue background.  The first two letters of the plate indicated the Province followed by a star, then four digits, and finally two letters. These plates were used until the introduction of the current system in 2009.

Province codes

Current Codes

Previous Codes

References

External links
 Images of different generations license plate
 Images of the various indicator-generations worldlicenseplates.com

Democratic Republic of the Congo
Democratic Republic of the Congo communications-related lists